Miller Canfield, P.L.C., doing business as Miller, Canfield, Paddock and Stone (founded in 1852), is an American law firm based in Detroit, Michigan. In 2014, the firm was ranked 165th largest in the United States in terms of attorney headcount by the National Law Journal. It is an international firm with offices and affiliated locations in the United States, Canada, Mexico, China, Poland, Qatar, and Ukraine.

Miller Canfield's headquarters is located at 150 West Jefferson in Downtown Detroit.

In 2022, Miller Canfield expands in Ukraine, establishes affiliation with Kyiv-based Dictio Law Firm.

Notable lawyers and alumni
Spencer Abraham - former United States Senator and former United States Secretary of Energy
Ella Bully-Cummings - first female Chief of Police for the City of Detroit
Eddie Francis - former Mayor of Windsor, Ontario
Saul Green - Deputy Mayor of Detroit and former US Attorney for the Eastern District of Michigan
Matthew Frederick Leitman - Judge, United States District Court for the Eastern District of Michigan
Stephen Markman - current Michigan Supreme Court Justice
Jay B. Rising - former Michigan State Treasurer
Gerald Ellis Rosen - Judge, United States District Court for the Eastern District of Michigan
Clifford Taylor - former Chief Justice, Michigan Supreme Court

References

External links

Miller Canfield U.S. Homepage
Former Pfizer Counsel Joins Miller Canfield
Former Pfizer Counsel Joins Miller Canfield
Miller Canfield Expands to Mexico
Miller Canfield obtains $300 Million Verdict for Valassis

Law firms established in 1852
Law firms based in Detroit
Insolvency and corporate recovery firms
1852 establishments in Michigan